Magomedmurad Saidpashievich Gadzhiev (born February 15, 1988, in Dagestan) is a Russian-born Polish freestyle wrestler of Dargin heritage. Senior world champion 2021.

Life and career
He originates from Dagestan and started practicing wrestling in 2000. Until 2012, he represented Russia. Since 2012, he has been representing Poland after having been granted Polish citizenhip.

He is the International Master of Sports in Freestyle Wrestling. He is bronze medalist of 2010 Russian Freestyle Wrestling Nationals. At 2015 World Wrestling Championships in the second round he lost to World Champion Frank Chamizo (3-4) European Games 2015 runner-up, who competed in the men's freestyle 70 kg category at the 2015 European Games and won the silver medal. Golden Grand prix Ivan Yarygin 2010 champion, bronze medalist in 2009 and 2011, European Championships 2010 runner-up, Ramzan Kadyrov Cup 3rd 2010 and World Cup 2011 winner. Gadzhiev took part in the 2016 Summer Olympic Games and the 2020 Summer Olympic Games.

Championships and accomplishments
Junior level:
2008 Junior World Championships gold medalist – 66 kg
Senior Level:
2010 Russian Nationals bronze medalist – 66 kg
2010 World Cup gold medalist – 66 kg
2010 European Championships silver medalist – 66 kg
2010 Ivan Yarygin international runner-up – 66 kg
2009, 2011 Ivan Yarygin international 3rd – 66 kg
2010 Ramzan Kadyrov and Adlan Varayev Cup 3rd – 66 kg
2014 intercontinental Cup winner – 70 kg
2015 World Wrestling Championships 7th – 65 kg
2015 European Games silver medalist – 70 kg
2016 European Championships gold medalist – 70 kg
2017 World Championships silver medalist – 65 kg
2018 European Championships silver medalist – 70 kg

References

External links 
 
 
 

1988 births
Living people
Polish male sport wrestlers
Russian male sport wrestlers
Russian emigrants to Poland
Olympic wrestlers of Poland
Wrestlers at the 2016 Summer Olympics
Wrestlers at the 2020 Summer Olympics
European Games medalists in wrestling
European Games silver medalists for Poland
Wrestlers at the 2015 European Games
Wrestlers at the 2019 European Games
World Wrestling Championships medalists
European Wrestling Championships medalists
European Wrestling Champions
Polish Muslims
Naturalized citizens of Poland
Sportspeople from Dagestan
People from Karabudakhkentsky District